The Judomioidea are a superfamily of trilobites, a group of extinct marine arthropods. Its species lived during the Lower Cambrian (Atdabanian).

References 

Olenellina
Cambrian trilobites
Cambrian first appearances
Terreneuvian extinctions
Arthropod superfamilies